Chaleur Bay is natural bay on the island of Newfoundland in the province of Newfoundland and Labrador, Canada. Its features include cliffs, ravines and waterfalls.

See also
 List of communities in Newfoundland and Labrador
 List of ghost towns in Newfoundland and Labrador

References

Bays of Newfoundland and Labrador